Gallinas River may refer to:

Gallinas River (Sierra Leone)
Gallinas River (New Mexico), a tributary of the Rio Grande
Gallinas River (Mexico), in Huasteca

See also
Gallinas (disambiguation)